Rheodytes devisi is a Pleistocene fossil turtle from the Darling Downs of Queensland, Australia. It was described from material originally included in the description of Elseya uberima.

References

Rheodytes
Extinct turtles
Pleistocene reptiles of Australia
Fossils of Australia
Fossil taxa described in 2000
Taxa named by Scott A. Thomson
Turtles of Australia